Bodybuilding in the United States traces its early history to the 1860s when it was based on the east coast.  By the 1940s, it had arrived in Hawaii.  In the same period, the country was involved with the early internationalization of the sport. The sport had a golden age during the 1960s and 1970s when much of the activity was taking place on the west coast. Bodybuilding for women began to take off during the 1970s. A number of changes took place in the 1980s.

History 
Gymnasiums began to be built in the United States during the 1860s, with most of the first ones based on the east coast.  The spread of the tradition of physical conditioning was helped during this era because of the concept of muscular Christianity. In 1944, the sport made its way to Hawaii.  By 1948, a resident of San Francisco moved to Oahu and opened a gym, one of the few at the time that catered to the specific needs of bodybuilders.  The gym, Mit-Miks Health Studio, became one of the most influential centers for the sport in the state.

During the 1940s and 1950s, Chuck Sipes and Bill Pearl were two of the most entertaining        bodybuilders in the United States.  Their influence began to wane during the 1950s though as other competitors came on the scene. The United States was one of the two founding members of the International Federation of Bodybuilders, which was created by Ben and Joe Weider in 1946. A Mr. Hawaii competition was being held in 1950. A Mr. America contest was being held by 1953. By 1955, there was a national magazine for the sport.

The golden era of bodybuilding on the United States's west coast took place in the 1960s and 1970s, with much of the most active scene occurring in California.  A fair amount of this activity took place at Golds Gym in Santa Monica, which was the home base for a number of competitors during this era including Arnold Schwarzenegger.

Bodybuilding for women began to take off during the 1970s at a time when culturally there was a tension between governmental attempts to control women's bodies, and women trying to exert control using their own physicality.  Bodybuilding was seen by some women as form of recognition of their physical strength. During this period, bodybuilding judges in the United States were debating the standards to which women should be judged in competition and if they should be using the masculine ideal.

In 1979, the Hawaiian Islands Body Building Championships were held for the first time, and assisted in renewing interest in the sport in Hawaii. During the 1980s, the sport underwent a number of changes in the United States and internationally as it sought to appear more of a sport.  This included changing the names of several competitions held in the United States. In 1982, Chris Dickerson became the first African American to win the Mr. America contest.

In 1990, the Hawaiian Islands Body Building Championships included a women's competition for the first time. The 1992 edition of the Ms. Olympia contest was held in Chicago, Illinois with 20 competitors, including at least one from the United States.

Governance 
The United States has a national organization: the NPC that is recognized by the IFBB Pro League  as the national federation, representing the country's bodybuilding community.

Pictures

References